On 11 November 1914, Ottoman Sultan Mehmed V proclaimed holy war against the Entente powers and appealed for support from Muslims in Entente-controlled countries. The declaration, which called for Muslims to support the Ottomans in Entente-controlled areas and for jihad against "all enemies of the Ottoman Empire, except the Central Powers", was initially drafted on 11 November and first publicly read out in front of a large crowd on 14 November. That same day, a fatwa (Islamic religious decree) to the same effect was declared by the Fetva Emini ("fatwa consultant", the Ottoman official in charge of dictating tafsir on behalf of the Shaykh al-Islām).

Farish A. Noor points to the 1915 Singapore Mutiny, arguing that the call did have a considerable impact on Muslims around the world.

References

Sources

 

November 1914 events
1914 in the Ottoman Empire
Ottoman Empire in World War I
Jihad